The Hamburger Abendblatt (English: Hamburg Evening Newspaper) is a German daily newspaper in Hamburg.

The paper focuses on news in Hamburg and area, and produces regional supplements with news from Norderstedt, Ahrensburg, Harburg, and Pinneberg.  Politically the paper is mildly conservative, but usually pro-government, including during SPD administrations.

History and profile
Four previous Hamburg newspapers had the word Abendblatt ("Evening Newspaper") in their title, including one named the Hamburger Abendblatt, founded on 2 May 1820.

This incarnation of the Hamburger Abendblatt, however, was first published after World War II beginning on 14 October 1948 with an initial edition of 60,000 copies. The paper received a publishing license from the Hamburg Senate and Mayor Max Brauer, making it the first daily paper of post-war Germany to receive a license from German rather than Allied occupation authorities.  After about six months of operation, its circulation increased to 170,000 copies daily. Until the 1970s it was delivered in the afternoon, but it is now delivered in the early morning.

From 1948 through 2013  Hamburger Abendblatt was published by Axel Springer AG. The paper is published by Funke Mediengruppe, who purchased it from Axel Springer effective 1 January 2014. The paper used to appear Monday through Saturday only, but since 29 October 2006 it has also published a Sunday edition to compete with the Hamburger Morgenpost's introduction of a Sunday edition on 5 November 2006.

Circulation
Hamburger Abendblatt had a circulation of 288,000 copies in 2001. The circulation of the paper was 252,533 copies in the first quarter of 2006. It rose to 286,992 copies in the second quarter of 2009.

Editor-in-chiefs 
 Wilhelm Schulze, 1948–1952
 Otto Siemer, 1952–1965
 Martin Saller, 1965–1969
 Werner Titzrath, 1969–1983
 Klaus Korn, 1983–1989
 Peter Kruse, 1989–2001
 Menso Heyl, 2001–2008
 Claus Strunz, 2008 until June 2011
 Lars Haider, since July 2011

References 

 (The newspaper's own summary of its history.)

External links
  

1948 establishments in Germany
Daily newspapers published in Germany
German-language newspapers
German news websites
Newspapers published in Hamburg
Publications established in 1948